ESPN Classic is a Canadian English language discretionary sports specialty channel owned by CTV Specialty Television Inc., a joint venture between Bell Media (80%) and ESPN (20%). Intended as the Canadian equivalent of the American channel of the same name, it broadcasts a range of archive sports coverage, talk shows, documentaries and films.

History
ESPN Classic was licensed as Classic Sports in November 2000 by the Canadian Radio-television and Telecommunications Commission (CRTC), and was launched on September 7, 2001 as ESPN Classic Canada. A few years after its launch, "Canada" was dropped from its name and logo to "ESPN Classic". ESPN Classic is the only ESPN-branded channel broadcasting in Canada, although in addition to owning a stake in the Canadian version of ESPN Classic, ESPN is part-owner of TSN (which uses on-air branding similar to the flagship ESPN channel in the U.S.), along with Bell Media.

With the European version of the channel closing in 2013 and the American version of the channel ceasing operations at the end of 2021, the Canadian iteration is the last active vestige of the ESPN Classic brand.

Programming
The channel's programming consists primarily of archived sporting events associated with TSN-owned event rights, including hockey (particularly IIHF events), the CFL and NFL, basketball, and curling, as well as SportsCentre-branded highlights compilations and countdowns originating from the main TSN network.

References

External links
 

Classic
Sports television networks in Canada
Bell Media networks
Television channels and stations established in 2001
Digital cable television networks in Canada
English-language television stations in Canada
Classic television networks